Leeser is a Yiddish surname derived from the Hebrew name Eliezer. People with the name include:

 Isaac Leeser (1806–1868), American Jewish leader
 Julian Leeser (born 1976), Australian politician
 Oscar Leeser (born 1958), American politician, Mayor of El Paso
 Rolf Leeser (1929–2018), German-born footballer and fashion designer
 Thomas Leeser (born 1952), American architect

See also
 Leeser Architecture
 Leeser Rosenthal (1794–1868), book collector 

Yiddish-language surnames